Susan Ruth Rankin (born 1956) is an American academic specializing in higher education policy and queer studies. She was a member of the faculty and administration at Pennsylvania State University from 1979 to 2013. Rankin is recognized as a prominent figure in the LGBTQ sports movement and was one of the first openly lesbian NCAA Division I coaches.

Education 
Sue Rankin completed a B.S. in physiology, health, and physical education at the Montclair State Teachers College in 1978. At the Pennsylvania State University (PSU), she earned a M.S. (1981) in physiology with a specialization in aging and a Ph.D. (1994) in higher education administration with a focus in organizational theory and social justice in higher education. Her master's thesis was titled, A comparison of the use of Nautilus apparatus and Universal Gym Equipment for the development of strength and flexibility. Rankin's dissertation was titled, The Perceptions of Heterosexual Faculty and Administrators Toward Gay Men and Lesbians.

Career 
Rankin joined the faculty at PSU in 1979 as a lecturer in kinesiology in the College of Health and Human Development. From 1998 to 2001, she was coordinator of LGBT Equity at PSU. Rankin held various administrative positions including head of public scholarship initiatives and senior diversity planning analyst. She was an affiliate assistant professor of education policy studies from 2002 to 2006 before being promoted to associate professor and senior research associate from 2006 to 2013.

Rankin is recognized as a prominent figure in the LGBTQ sports movement. She was the head coach of the women's softball team at PSU from 1979 to 1996.

Rankin researches higher education policy and queer studies. Her studies investigate LGBT life on college campuses.

Personal life 
Rankin was one of the first openly lesbian NCAA Division I coaches during the 1980s and 1990s.

Selected works

Books

Journal articles

References

External links
 

Living people
1956 births
Place of birth missing (living people)
Montclair State University alumni
Penn State College of Education alumni
Pennsylvania State University faculty
LGBT studies academics
Educational researchers
20th-century American women writers
21st-century American women writers
20th-century American non-fiction writers
21st-century American non-fiction writers
American women academics
American softball coaches
Penn State Nittany Lions softball coaches
Pennsylvania State University staff
Lesbian academics
LGBT people from Pennsylvania
American lesbian writers
Lesbian sportswomen
American LGBT sportspeople
LGBT softball players